{{DISPLAYTITLE:C4H10O2S2}}
The molecular formula C4H10O2S2 (molar mass: 154.25 g/mol, exact mass: 154.0122 u) may refer to:

 Dithioerythritol (DTE)
 Dithiothreitol (DTT)

Molecular formulas